Lopérec is a commune in the Finistère department of Brittany in north-western France.  It is part of the canton of Carhaix-Plouguer and the arrondissement of Châteaulin.  Lopérec is located within the Parc naturel régional d'Armorique.

Population
Inhabitants of Lopérec are called Lopérécois in French.

See also
Communes of the Finistère department
Parc naturel régional d'Armorique
Calvary at Lopérec

References

External links
Official website 

Mayors of Finistère Association 

Communes of Finistère
Finistère communes articles needing translation from French Wikipedia